is a Japanese singer, composer, lyricist, actress and activist.

She was born in Harbin, Manchukuo, to Japanese parents and graduated from the University of Tokyo.  She worked as a visiting professor at Josai International University.

While being held hostage by hijackers on All Nippon Airways Flight 857, Kato used her cell phone to keep in contact with police during the hijacking.

Discography

Album 
 私の中のひとり (1970), Polydor Records
 この世に生まれてきたら (1974), Polydor Records
 いく時代かがありまして (1975), Polydor Records
 回帰船 (1976), Polydor Records
 さびた車輪 (1977) Kitty Records
 A Siren Dream (1983), Polydor Records
 日本哀歌集 (1983), Polydor Records
 La Femme qui vient de Cypango (1991), Universal
 Hana (1995), Universal

Live and collaborations 
 Live – Tokiko Kato and Kiyoshi Hasegawa (1978), Polydor Records
 Miłość ci wszystko wybaczy – Tokiko Kato and Ryuichi Sakamoto (1982), Polydor Records
 Songs from the Cold Seas – Hector Zazou (1994), Columbia Records

Filmography

Films 
 Izakaya Chōji (1983) as Shigeko
 Hachikō Monogatari (1987) as Tamiko
  (1990)
 Porco Rosso (1992) as Madame Gina (voice) 
 Open House (1998) as Tokiko
  (2002)
  (2002) as Eiko
 Let's Talk About the Old Times (2022) as herself

Television 
  (4 episodes, 2006) as Michiyo Yamashita
  (2017) narration

References

External links 
  

1943 births
Japanese women singer-songwriters
Hijacking survivors
Living people
Japanese people from Manchukuo
20th-century Japanese actresses
21st-century Japanese actresses
20th-century Japanese women singers
20th-century Japanese singers
21st-century Japanese women singers
21st-century Japanese singers